Nice Actimize acquired Guardian Analytics is an American privately held company headquartered in Mountain View, California in August 2020 which provides behavioral analytics and machine learning technology for preventing banking fraud. It was established in 2005 and its products are based on anomaly detection to monitor financial transactions. 

In 2012, Guardian Analytics together with McAfee dissected the US$78 million cyber attack titled Operation High Roller. In 2013 Guardian Analytics was listed among the Top 10 Influencers in banking information security. As of September 2016, nearly 430 financial institutions are using Guardian Analytics products to mitigate fraud risk and rely on the company to stop sophisticated criminal attacks.

In June 2020, NICE Ltd. announced the acquisition of Guardian Analytics to "extend NICE Actimize's world-class financial crime and compliance solutions across the entire financial services sector."

Services
Guardian Analytics offers fraud prevention services for financial institutions. The general architecture includes two main components. The first component, the risk engine, merges analytics and behavior-based models of a user to create a probabilistic profile of each individual. By recognizing anomalous behavior, it is possible to identify fraudulent activity before loss occurs. The risk engine dynamically adapts to user behavior to be able to detect new fraud attacks. The second component is Visual Analytics, a data browser used by financial institutions to monitor, investigate, and resolve potential fraud by accessing collected data.  This visual interface shows risk scores and the underlying contextual information to facilitate analysis and investigation.

Guardian Analytics is able to detect fraudulent activities such as account takeover, account reconnaissance and fraudulent wire, ACH, and bill pay transactions. Guardian Analytics is not specific to the type of threat and can protect against cyber attacks such as phishing, vishing and Man in the Browser. The software is transparent to account holders and does not require any action on their side.

Guardian Analytics markets several services, targeting particular types of financial interactions:

 Guardian Analytics Online (for retail  and business )
 Guardian Analytics Mobile 
 Guardian Analytics ACH (for ODFIs & RDFIs) 
 Guardian Analytics ACH Real-time (for ODFIs & RDFIs)
 Guardian Analytics Wire
 Guardian Analytics Wire Real-time
 Guardian Analytics Access

Guardian Analytics is marketed as software as a service and can be deployed in the company's SAS 70 Type II certified environment.

FraudDESK
FraudDESK is a fraud monitoring managed service.

See also
Internet fraud
Cyber-collection
Operation High Roller

References

External links
 Guardian Analytics on Fox Business News
 Guardian Analytics on PBS
 Fiserv Offers Guardian Analytics for Financial Institution Clients to Secure Online Banking Channels
Computer security companies
Companies based in Mountain View, California